Westside Middle School or West Side Middle School may refer to:

Westside Middle School (Nebraska)
Westside Middle School in Barrow County, Georgia
Westside Middle School in Groton, Connecticut
West Side Middle School in Elkhart, Indiana
West Side Middle School in Waterbury, Connecticut
Westside Consolidated School District in Craighead County, Arkansas, the site of the Westside Middle School massacre